Final league standings for the 1922-23 St. Louis Soccer League.

League standings

External links
St. Louis Soccer Leagues (RSSSF)
The Year in American Soccer - 1923

1922-23
1922–23 domestic association football leagues
1922–23 in American soccer
St Louis Soccer
St Louis Soccer